When We Talk About Love is the fourth album by thenAustralian indie rock band Oh Mercy. It was released in June 2015 and peaked at number 28 on the ARIA Charts.

At the ARIA Music Awards of 2015, the album won the ARIA Award for Best Adult Contemporary Album.

Track listing 
 "Without You" - 4:17
 "I Don't Really Want to Know"	- 2:57
 "Sandy" - 3:52
 "Lady Eucalyptus"	- 4:23
 "Let Me Be Him" - 3:07
 "If You Come Around Tonight" - 3:26
 "Iron Cross" - 3:20
 "All The Roads Lead to You" - 3:40
 "I Believe It" - 2:42
 "Can't You Hear My Body (Calling Out to You)" - 3:40
 "Cool Waiter" - 3:21
 "Catherine" - 2:41

Chart

References 

2015 albums
Oh Mercy (band) albums
ARIA Award-winning albums